Delmar Gale Bullman (September 18, 1901 – June 24, 1977) was an American football player and coach. He played college football at West Virginia Wesleyan College and professionally in the National Football League (NFL) with the Columbus Tigers. Bullman served as the head football coach at the Missouri School of Mines and Metallurgy—now known as Missouri University of Science and Technology—from 1937 to 1963, compiling a record of 96–112–9. He was also athletic director there from 1937 to 1967.

Bullman was born in Sistersville, West Virginia. During World War II, he served as a lieutenant in the United States Navy. Bullman died on June 24, 1977, in Rolla, Missouri.

Head coaching record

College

References

External links
 
 

1901 births
1977 deaths
American football ends
United States Navy personnel of World War II
Columbus Tigers players
High school football coaches in West Virginia
Missouri S&T Miners athletic directors
Missouri S&T Miners football coaches
Missouri University of Science and Technology faculty
People from Sistersville, West Virginia
Players of American football from Ohio
Sportspeople from Marietta, Ohio
United States Navy officers
Washington University Bears football coaches
West Virginia Wesleyan Bobcats football players